The 2020 KNSB Dutch Allround Championships in speed skating were held in Heerenveen at the Thialf ice skating rink from 25 January to 26 January 2020. The tournament was part of the 2019–2020 speed skating season. Jan Blokhuijsen and Antoinette de Jong won the allround titles.

Schedule

Medalists

Allround

Distance

Classification

Men's allround

Women's allround

Source:

References

KNSB Dutch Allround Championships
KNSB Dutch Allround Championships
2020 Allround
KNSB Dutch Allround Championships, 2020
January 2020 sports events in the Netherlands
2020s in Amsterdam